The Russell River is a river in Far North Queensland, Australia.

Location and features

The Russell River rises in the Wooroonooran National Park sourced from drainage of the Bellenden Ker Range, below Mount Bartle Frere and Mount Bellenden Ker. In its upper reaches, the course of the river meanders highly as it flows south by east and exits the Wooroonooran National Park. The river flows north by east, joined by the Josephine Creek and it has descended over the Josephine Falls. The river reaches its confluence with the Mulgrave River in an estuarine state, with the Mulgrave flowing east for a short distance to empty into Coral Sea via the Mutchero Inlet. Water from the river is used to grow sugar cane on the coastal plains surrounding the Russell River's lower reaches.

The river descends  over its  course.

The river is a popular location for whitewater rafting.

With the Mulgrave River, the Russell River has a well recorded flood history with documented evidence of flooding beginning in the late 1930s.

See also

Rivers of Queensland

References

External links

Rivers of Far North Queensland